Ore railway station serves Ore in East Sussex, England. It is on the Marshlink Line, and train services are provided by Southern, with a single peak hour service operated by Southeastern.

Third rail 750 V DC electrification from Hastings ends here.

History
The station opened in 1888 and was electrified in 1935.

Ore station was once adjoined to the north by a depot for electric trains but this closed in May 1986 following the electrification of the Hastings to Tonbridge line and relocation of electric units for servicing and cleaning to St Leonards depot.

Facilities 
Today, there are two platforms linked by a footbridge. Both platforms have shelters and modern help points. Ore station has been unstaffed since a booking office fire in the late 1980s, although the station has a self-service ticket machine available for ticket purchases. The station has step-free access to the Ashford bound platform only.

The area has in the past been a hotspot for vandalism but is now covered comprehensively by CCTV. It is scheduled for re-development in the future which may involve the station being renamed to either Hastings East or Ore Valley.

Services 

Ore station is the terminus for electric East Coastway services.
Trains terminating and restarting at this station run forward into a turnaround siding which runs adjacent to the Marshlink Line as far as Ore Tunnel. Ore is also the start of the single track section on the Marshlink Line.

Off-peak, all services at Ore are operated by Southern using  DMUs and  EMUs.

The typical off-peak service in trains per hour is:

 1 tph to  via 
 1 tph to 

The station is also served by a single peak hour service to London Charing Cross via , operated by Southeastern.

Southeastern initially planned to cease serving Ore from the May 2020 timetable change although this change did not take place and Southeastern continue to operate a daily service at the station.

References

External links 

Transport in Hastings
Railway stations in East Sussex
DfT Category F2 stations
Former South Eastern Railway (UK) stations
Railway stations in Great Britain opened in 1888
Railway stations served by Govia Thameslink Railway
Railway stations served by Southeastern